The Voice of Memory is a 1997 collection of interviews, originally published in Primo Levi: Conversazioni e interviste.

1997 non-fiction books
Books by Primo Levi
Books published posthumously
Books of interviews
Italian non-fiction books
Giulio Einaudi Editore books
Polity (publisher) books